Caught in a Free State was a dramatised television series made by RTÉ in 1983. This four-part series was about German spies in neutral Ireland during World War II, known in Ireland as "The Emergency".

Production
The series was written by Brian Lynch, with music by Seóirse Bodley and directed by Peter Ormrod and Designed by Pat Molloy. The series was the winner of the best drama award at the Banff World Television Festival in Canada and also won a Jacob's Award in Ireland.

Parts of the dialogue were recorded in German with English subtitles, partly in the hope of a sale of the series to a German television station.

Principal actors
Goetz Burger as "Gunther Schultz" (based on Günther Schütz of Abwehr)
Peter Jankowsky as Hermann Görtz (chief spy of Abwehr in Ireland)
John Kavanagh as "Colonel Brian Dillon" (based on Colonel Dan Bryan of the G2 section of the Irish Army)
Barry McGovern as Éamon de Valera (Taoiseach)
Niall Tóibín as Stephen Hayes (Irish Republican Army)
O. Z. Whitehead as David Gray (US Ambassador to Ireland)

Episodes
The spies are frequently depicted as out of touch with the realities of Irish life. They are also often depicted as individuals highly unsuited for espionage. At times, the absurdities take on a comic dimension - such as in the arrest of Henry Obed, an Indian working for Abwehr. It is notable that the German plans for Operation Green (the intended invasion of Ireland) also included a considerable amount of outdated information.

Whilst dramatised (and some names have been changed, notably that of Schütz to "Schultz") the plots in Caught in a Free State are based on actual events and persons. The anachronistic reference to "Free State" is deliberate as the Irish Free State had been superseded by the new Constitution of Ireland of 1937, which is a recurring theme. Both Günther Schütz and Dan Bryan were still alive during the filming (in 1983), hence the change of names.

Episode 1: Hermann Görtz is parachuted into Ireland. He tries to return to Germany by boat but is intercepted by the Irish Navy and interned.
Episode 2: Ernst Weber-Drohl, a 60-year-old former circus strongman, is landed by submarine on the coast of County Wexford.
Episode 3: "Gunter Schultz" is arrested, interrogated and threatened with execution for spying.
Episode 4: The end of the War. Herman Görtz commits suicide rather than face deportation.

Transmission
It was also broadcast in the United Kingdom on Channel 4 in April 1984, and was repeated in July 1986.

See also
History of the Republic of Ireland
Irish neutrality
Irish neutrality during World War II
IRA/Abwehr collaboration in World War II
Plan Kathleen
Operation Green
Oskar Metzke

References

External links
Brian Lynch (writer)
 
RTÉ

1983 Irish television series debuts
1983 Irish television series endings
Independent Ireland in World War II
Irish drama television series
RTÉ original programming
World War II espionage
World War II television drama series
Cultural depictions of Éamon de Valera
Television series set in 1940